Claude Barzotti (born 23 July 1953 as Francesco Barzotti) is a Belgian singer of Italian origin of the 1980s. Barzotti recorded several songs which each sold hundreds of thousands of copies. He first achieved success in 1981 with his song "Le Rital."

Biography and career
Barzotti, whose real first name was Francesco, was born in Châtelineau, Belgium, but raised in Italy. Barzotti moved back to Belgium at the age of 18 and settled in the town of Court-Saint-Étienne. Barzotti began his musical career in France in 1981 with his song "Madame," which sold 400,000 copies. However, later in the year, Barzotti found widespread success with his song "Le Rital," which propelled him to household-name status.

"Rital" is a difficult to translate French slang term used to refer in a derogatory sense to people of Italian descent, the song deals with Barzotti's experiences as a young child and how "he would have preferred to be named Dupont" (a common French surname) but the song also deals with his pride concerning the term, exemplified in lines such as "Je suis rital et je le reste," which translates to "I'm Italian and will so remain." Barzotti's career continued throughout the 1980s, and his last major successful song was in 1990s "Aime-moi" (English:Love Me), at which point many people believed his career was far from over. Although Barzotti took advantage of the wave of nostalgia which gripped France at the turn of the 21st century, he was unable to capture the musical prominence he had once held. Because of his distinctive voice and great successes in the French music industry, he is considered one of the most prominent French pop musicians of the 1980s. Barzotti's music was also popular in Québec, with songs such as "Je ne t'écrirai plus" (English: I Won't Write You Anymore), "Prends bien soin d'elle" (English: Take Good Care of Her), "C'est moi qui pars" (English: It's Me Who's Leaving), and "J'ai les bleus" (English: I Have the Blues).

Barzotti's songs have also been featured in movies and DVDs in France, the movies in which his songs have been featured have sold more than five million copies. He also wrote the Belgian entry to the 1992 Eurovision Song Contest.

Today
Barzotti's compilation "best of" was released in France in 2003, and he also recorded a more traditional Italian song, "Vado Via." He has released a new single, "Jada", on 8 August 2007, the proceeds from which go to benefit children in poor countries who do not have access to education. His 2012 album C'est mon histoire debuted at No. 39 on the Canadian Albums Chart.

Selected discography
1981: Madame
1981: Le Rital
1982: Je te n'écrirai plus
1989: Elle me tue (English: She Kills Me)
1990: Aime-moi

References

Sources
 This article incorporates text translated from the corresponding French Wikipedia article as of 27 September 2007.

External links
Barzotti Fan Club 
Lyrics for Barzotti's songs 

1953 births
Living people
People from Châtelet
Belgian people of Italian descent
Belgian pop singers
Belgian male singers
French-language singers of Belgium